Butler Township is one of the twenty-two townships of Knox County, Ohio, United States.  The 2010 census found 1,171 people in the township.

Geography
Located in the eastern part of the county, it borders the following townships:
Union Township - north
Tiverton Township, Coshocton County - northeast corner
Newcastle Township, Coshocton County - east
Perry Township, Coshocton County - southeast corner
Jackson Township - south
Clay Township - southwest corner
Harrison Township - west
Howard Township - northwest corner

No municipalities are located in Butler Township.

Name and history
Butler Township was organized in 1825.
 
It is one of six Butler Townships statewide.

Government
The township is governed by a three-member board of trustees, who are elected in November of odd-numbered years to a four-year term beginning on the following January 1. Two are elected in the year after the presidential election and one is elected in the year before it. There is also an elected township fiscal officer, who serves a four-year term beginning on April 1 of the year after the election, which is held in November of the year before the presidential election. Vacancies in the fiscal officership or on the board of trustees are filled by the remaining trustees.

References

External links
County website

Townships in Knox County, Ohio
Townships in Ohio